2,2'-Azobis(2-amidinopropane) dihydrochloride (AAPH) is a chemical compound used to study the chemistry of the oxidation of drugs.

It is a free radical-generating azo compound. It is gaining prominence as a model oxidant in small molecule and protein therapeutics for its ability to initiate oxidation reactions via both nucleophilic and free radical mechanisms.

2,2′-azobis (2-amidinopropane) dihydrochloride has been used in experiments on linoleic acid subjected to induced oxidation with different combinations of binary mixtures of natural phenolics. The experiments show that some binary mixtures can lead to a synergetic antioxidant effect while other mixtures lead to an antagonistic effect.

References 

Azo compounds
Amidines